Samuel Gbonda was Bishop of Bo from 1994 until 2008.

References

Anglican bishops of Bo
21st-century Anglican bishops in Sierra Leone
Year of birth missing (living people)
Living people
20th-century Anglican bishops in Sierra Leone
Place of birth missing (living people)